This is a list of notable organizations which have voiced their endorsement of Joe Biden's campaign for President of the United States in the 2020 U.S. presidential election.

Activist groups

350 Action
Alaskans Together for Equality
Bend the Arc
Brady Campaign
CASA de Maryland
Center for Biological Diversity
Center for Popular Democracy
 Chesapeake Climate Action Network
Citizens Union
Clean Water Action
Coalition for Humane Immigrant Rights of Los Angeles
Coalition to Stop Gun Violence
Color of Change
Council for a Livable World
Democratic Majority for Israel PAC
End Citizens United
Environment America
Equality Arizona
Equality California
 Equality Florida
EqualityMaine
Everytown for Gun Safety
Fair Wisconsin
Friends of the Earth
Garden State Equality
Giffords
Harvey Milk Lesbian, Gay, Bisexual, Transgender Democratic Club
High School Democrats of America
Houston GLBT Political Caucus
Human Rights Campaign
Humane Society of the United States
Indivisible
Jewish Democratic Council of America
J Street
Justice for Janitors
League of Conservation Voters
Let America Vote
MoveOn
NARAL Pro-Choice America
National Association of Social Workers
National Center for Transgender Equality
National Iranian American Council
National LGBT Chamber of Commerce
National Organization for Women
National Wildlife Federation
Natural Resources Defense Council
The People's Alliance
People for the American Way
Planned Parenthood
Population Connection
Protect Our Winters
Republican Voters against Trump
The RINJ Foundation
Sierra Club
Southern Alliance for Clean Energy
Stonewall Democrats
Stonewall Democrats Utah
Sunrise Movement
UltraViolet
UnidosUS
U.S. Women's Chamber of Commerce
Voto Latino
VoteVets

Labor unions

National and international unions
Actors' Equity Association, representing 43,648
AFL–CIO, representing 13 million
Alliance for Retired Americans, representing 4.4 million
Amalgamated Transit Union, representing 200,000
American Federation of Government Employees, representing 670,000
American Federation of Musicians, representing 73,071
American Federation of School Administrators, representing 20,000
American Federation of State, County, and Municipal Employees, representing 1.3 million
American Federation of Teachers, representing 1.7 million
American Guild of Musical Artists, representing 7,523
American Postal Workers Union, representing 330,000
American Train Dispatchers Association, representing 2,718
Association of Flight Attendants, representing 50,000
Association of Professional Flight Attendants, representing 26,000
Association of Theatrical Press Agents & Managers
Bakery, Confectionery, Tobacco Workers and Grain Millers' International Union, representing 73,694
Brotherhood of Railroad Signalmen, representing 10,500
Civil Service Employees Association, representing 300,000
Coalition of Black Trade Unionists, representing 1.2 million
Communications Workers of America, representing 700,000
International Alliance of Theatrical Stage Employees, representing 150,000
International Association of Bridge, Structural, Ornamental, and Reinforcing Iron Workers, representing 130,000
International Association of Fire Fighters, representing 313,000
International Association of Heat and Frost Insulators and Allied Workers, representing 30,000
International Association of Machinists and Aerospace Workers, representing 570,000
International Association of Sheet Metal, Air, Rail and Transportation Workers, representing 216,000
International Brotherhood of Electrical Workers, representing 725,000
International Brotherhood of Teamsters, representing 1.4 million
International Federation of Professional and Technical Engineers, representing 80,000
International Longshoremen's Association, representing 65,000
International Longshore and Warehouse Union, representing 33,000
International Organization of Masters, Mates & Pilots, representing 5,500 
International Union of Bricklayers and Allied Craftworkers
International Union of Elevator Constructors, representing 28,620
International Union of Operating Engineers, Representing 374,000
International Union of Painters and Allied Trades, representing 103,858
Laborers' International Union of North America, representing 557,999
Marine Engineers' Beneficial Association, representing 23,400
National Association of Government Employees, representing over 100,000
National Association of Letter Carriers, representing over 300,000
National Education Association, representing 3 million
National Federation of Federal Employees, representing 100,000
National Nurses United, representing 150,000
National Postal Mail Handlers Union, representing 50,000
National Treasury Employees Union, representing 150,000
North America's Building Trades Unions, representing 3 million
Office and Professional Employees International Union, representing 105,000
Operative Plasterers' and Cement Masons' International Association, representing 44,000
Pride at Work
Retail, Wholesale and Department Store Union, representing 60,522
Sailors' Union of the Pacific, representing 736
Seafarers International Union, representing 35,498
Service Employees International Union, representing 1.9 million
Stage Directors and Choreographers Society, representing 2,652
Transportation Trades Department, AFL–CIO
Transport Workers Union of America, representing 151,000
UNITE HERE, representing 300,000
United Association, representing 329,954
United Autoworkers, representing 390,000
United Brotherhood of Carpenters and Joiners of America, Representing 445,000
United Farm Workers, representing 10,278 
United Food and Commercial Workers, representing 1.3 million
United Steelworkers, representing 1.2 million
United Union of Roofers, Waterproofers and Allied Workers, representing 18,750
Utility Workers Union of America, representing 50,000
Writers Guild of America West, representing 24,440

Statewide and local unions
1199SEIU United Healthcare Workers East, representing 347,139
AFSCME Council 31, representing 100,000
California Federation of Teachers, representing 120,000
California School Employees Association, representing 248,000
California Teachers Association, representing 310,000
Chicago Teachers Union, representing 25,000
Connecticut Education Association, representing 43,000
Culinary Workers Union, representing 60,000
District Council 37, representing 225,000
Education Minnesota, representing 86,000
Florida AFL–CIO, representing 500,000
King County Labor Council, representing 75,000
Maine AFL–CIO, representing 36,000
Maine State Employees Association, representing 13,000
Maine State Nurses Association, representing 2,000
Massachusetts AFL–CIO, representing 400,000
Michigan Education Association, representing 157,000
New York City Central Labor Council, representing 1.5 million
Ohio Federation of Teachers, representing 20,000
Oregon AFL–CIO, representing 125,000
Pennsylvania AFL–CIO, representing 800,000
Rhode Island AFL–CIO, representing 80,000
SEIU 1199 WKO
SEIU 32BJ, representing 75,000
South Bay Labor Council, representing 100,000
Texas AFL–CIO, representing 235,000
Texas State Teachers Association, representing 68,000
UFCW Local 1776, representing 20,000
Virginia AFL-CIO
Washington State Labor Council, representing 550,000
West Virginia AFL–CIO, representing 80,000
Wisconsin AFL–CIO, representing 250,000

Newspapers, magazines, and other news media

Political organizations

43 Alumni for Biden
314 Action
Alabama Democratic Conference
Alice B. Toklas LGBT Democratic Club
American Bridge 21st Century
Arab American Political Action Committee
ASPIRE PAC
Asian American Action Fund
Black Economic Alliance
College Democrats of America
BOLD PAC
Congressional Black Caucus PAC
Democratic Black Caucus of Florida
Democratic Governors Association
Democrats for Education Reform
Emerge America
EMILY's List
Equality PAC
Fair Share Action
Fraternal PAC
Fuse Washington
Independent Voters of Illinois-Independent Precinct Organization
Indiana Black Legislative Caucus
Joint Action Committee for Political Affairs
Justice Democrats
The Lincoln Project
National Committee to Preserve Social Security and Medicare
National Conference of Democratic Mayors
National Federation of Democratic Women
National Women's Political Caucus
New Democrat Coalition
NextGen America
Occupy Democrats
Priorities USA Action
Progressive Change Campaign Committee
Public Affairs Council
REPAIR
Right Side PAC
SAVE Dade
Young Democrats of America

Political parties

International
 (Mexico)
More Europe (Italy)
Social Democrat Hunchakian Party (Armenia)
Social Democratic Party of Croatia (Croatia)
Vetëvendosje (Kosovo)

National
Working Families Party (previously endorsed Elizabeth Warren, then Bernie Sanders)

State and territorial

Alabama Democratic Party
Alaska Democratic Party
Arizona Democratic Party
Arkansas Democratic Party
California Democratic Party
Colorado Democratic Party
Connecticut Democratic Party
Connecticut Working Families Party
Delaware Democratic Party
Democrats Abroad
District of Columbia Democratic State Committee
Florida Democratic Party
Georgia Democratic Party
Guam Democratic Party
Hawaii Democratic Party
Idaho Democratic Party
Illinois Democratic Party
Iowa Democratic Party
Kansas Democratic Party
Kentucky Democratic Party
Louisiana Democratic Party
Maine Democratic Party
Maryland Democratic Party
Massachusetts Democratic Party
Michigan Democratic Party
Minnesota Democratic-Farmer-Labor Party
Mississippi Democratic Party
Nebraska Democratic Party
Nevada Democratic Party
New Hampshire Democratic Party
New Jersey Democratic Party
New Mexico Democratic Party
New York State Democratic Committee
North Carolina Democratic Party
North Dakota Democratic-Nonpartisan League Party
Northern Mariana Islands Democratic Party
Ohio Democratic Party
Oklahoma Democratic Party
Oregon Democratic Party
Oregon Independent Party
Pennsylvania Democratic Party
Puerto Rico Democratic Party
South Carolina Democratic Party
South Dakota Democratic Party
Tennessee Democratic Party
Texas Democratic Party
Utah Democratic Party
Vermont Democratic Party
Virginia Democratic Party
Virgin Islands Democratic Party
Washington Democratic Party
Wisconsin Democratic Party
Wyoming Democratic Party

Local
Brooklyn Democratic Party
Cook County Democratic Party

Websites
BroadwayWorld
CleanTechnica
Daily Kos
Electrek
Hollywood Life
Off The Bench Baseball
RogerEbert.com
ToughPigs.com

Other

Congressional delegations 
Delaware
Rhode Island
Vermont

Towns and tribes
Ballina, County Mayo (Ireland)
Mashpee Wampanoag Tribe
Thulasendrapuram (India)

Companies and private enterprises
The Araca Group
Creators Syndicate
Expensify
Gemini G.E.L.
Rabobank
Seattle Storm
Team Love Records
Vestas

See also

Notes

References

External links